Vilcashuamán Airport  is a very high elevation airport serving the town of Vilcashuamán in the Ayacucho Region of Peru. The runway has rising terrain in all quadrants.

See also

Transport in Peru
List of airports in Peru

References

External links
OpenStreetMap - Vilcashuamán
SkyVector - Vilcashuamán

Airports in Peru
Buildings and structures in Ayacucho Region